Tomáš Raček also known as Tomáš J.M. Raček (born 21 December 1947) is a Slovak theatre, film and television actor.

Filmography
2023 – Milan (Short film, Canada - Directed by Jakub Raček)
2006 – The Hit (Movie Trailer, Canada - Directed by John Grant)
1996 – Captive Heart: The James Mink Story (USA TV film - Directed by Bruce Pittman)
1989 – Jablonka (TV film)
1989 – Kamene (TV film)
1989 – Škola detektívky (TV seriál)
1988 – O láske a slávikoch (TV film)
1987 – Vizitka (TV film)
1987 – Hľadanie šťastnej chvíle (TV film)
1987 – Diplomati Októbra (TV film)
1987 – Matej Bel z Očovej (TV film)
1987 – Hrdina západu (TV film)
1986 – Akcia Edelstein (TV film)
1986 – Okná dokorán (TV seriál)
1986 – Čarbák (TV film)
1986 – Hra s ohňom (TV film)
1986 – Život Augusta Strindberga (koprodukcia Švédsko)
1985 – Sekera (TV film)
1985 – Skleníková Venuša
1984 – Návrat Jána Petru
1984 – O sláve a tráve
1984 – Súťaž o milión (TV film)
1984 – Lev Tolstoj (koprodukcia ZSSR)
1984 – V bludisku pamäti
1983 – Anička Jurkovičová (TV film)
1983 – Magma (TV film)
1983 – Maťo Šidlo Mátožidlo (TV seriál)
1983 – Šanca (TV film)
1983 – Husiarka a kráľ (TV film)
1983 – Ruže a sneh (TV film)
1982 – Podivné okolnosti (TV film)
1982 – Popolvár najväčší na svete
1982 – Cukor (TV film)
1981 – Čisté vody (TV film)
1981 – Štrnásť výstrelov (TV film)
1981 – Desiaty chlap (TV film)
1980 – Recept od starej mamy (TV film)
1980 – Svadba bez nevesty (TV seriál)
1980 – Zbožňovaná (TV film)
1980 – Klenovič Ján (TV film)
1980 – Podobizeň prvej lásky (TV film)
1979 – Choď a nelúč sa
1979 – Rosnička
1979 – Železné ruky (TV film)
1979 – Smrť šitá na mieru
1979 – Dobrí ľudia ešte žijú (TV film)
1979 – Prerušená hra
1979 – Smrť chodí po horách (TV film)
1979 – Blízke diaľavy
1979 – Cnostný Metod
1978 – Zbojnícky tanec (TV film)
1978 – Krutá ľúbosť
1978 – Kto ste, Jozef Gabčík?
1978 – Zem nezasľúbená (TV film)
1978 – Ežo Vlkolinský (TV film)
1978 – Úsmev diabla
1978 – Gábor Vlkolinský (TV film)
1978 – Izrafel (TV film)
1978 – Pustý dvor
1977 – Jedenáste prikázanie (TV seriál)
1977 – Louis Pasteur (TV film)
1977 – Ako sa Vinco zaťal (TV film)
1977 – Novinárske rozprávky (TV seriál)
1977 – Zlaté klasy (TV film)
1977 – Advokátka
1977 – Vzkriesenie (TV film)
1977 – Chlapi (TV film)
1977 – Bludička
1974 – Operácia Raketa (TV film)
1974 – Kronika (TV film)
1974 – Trofej neznámeho strelca
1973 – Horká zima
1973 – Havária (TV film)
1971 – Žiarlivé ženy (TV film)
1971 – V tieni vlkov (TV seriál)

References

Tomáš Raček at the Czech and Slovak Film Database 
Tomáš Raček at Superfilm 
Tomáš Raček at the Comenius University-Notable alumni

External links

Official site

Living people
1947 births
Slovak male film actors
Slovak male actors